Fairview High School can refer to:

In Canada:
Fairview High School, in Fairview, Alberta

In the United States:
Fairview High School (Cullman, Alabama)
Fairview High School (Colorado), in Boulder, Colorado
Fairview High School (Kentucky), in Westwood, Kentucky (postal address in Ashland, Kentucky)
Fairview High School (Louisiana), in Grant, Allen Parish, Louisiana
Fairview High School, in Fairview, Michigan
Fairview High School, in Fairview, Montana
Fairview High School (Fairview Park, Ohio)
Fairview High School (Sherwood, Ohio)
Fairview High School, in Fairview, Oklahoma
Fairview High School (Pennsylvania), in Fairview Township, Pennsylvania
Fairview High School (Tennessee), in Fairview, Tennessee

See also
 Fair View High School